is the 21st studio album by Japanese singer/songwriter Mari Hamada, released on February 15, 2012, by Meldac/Tokuma Japan. The album continues Hamada's heavy metal sound that began with Aestetica in 2010, with Loudness guitarist Akira Takasaki returning as a guest musician. It is also the first album since Romantic Night to not feature longtime collaborator Hiroyuki Ohtsuki. The album is offered in two editions: a single CD and a limited edition with a bonus disc.

Legenda peaked at No. 23 on Oricon's albums chart.

Track listing

Personnel 
 Akira Takasaki – guitar
 Michael Landau – guitar
 Takashi Masuzaki – guitar
 Leland Sklar – bass
 Kōichi Terasawa – bass
 Takanobu Masuda – keyboards
 Gregg Bissonette – drums
 Satoshi "Joe" Miyawaki – drums

Charts

References

External links 
  (Mari Hamada)
 Official website (Tokuma Japan)
 
 

2012 albums
Japanese-language albums
Mari Hamada albums
Tokuma Shoten albums